National Tertiary Route 756, or just Route 756 (or ) is a National Road Route of Costa Rica, located in the Alajuela, Puntarenas provinces.

Description
In Alajuela province the route covers San Ramón canton (Santiago district).

In Puntarenas province the route covers Esparza canton (San Rafael district).

References

Highways in Costa Rica